Pathia is an ancient Indian Parsi form of curry predominantly available in the curry houses of the United Kingdom.  It is hot, sweet, and sour, with use of chillies and tamarind.
It is based on a blend of tamarind and lime, with jaggery to help the balance and chillies for heat.
Vinegar is not a traditional ingredient, nor is ginger.

References

Parsi cuisine
Indian cuisine
Indian cuisine in the United Kingdom